Blakeley is an unincorporated community in Blakeley Township, Scott County, Minnesota, United States, along the Minnesota River.  The community is located west-southwest of Belle Plaine near the junction of Scott County Roads 1, 6, and 60.

Geography
Nearby places include Belle Plaine, Henderson, Green Isle, and the future home of Blakeley Bluffs Regional Park Reserve. U.S. Highway 169 is also in the immediate area.

History
Blakeley was laid out in 1867. It was named for Russell Blakely, a Minnesota businessperson in transportation. A post office was established in Blakeley in 1868, and remained in operation until it was discontinued in 1966.

References

Former municipalities in Minnesota
Unincorporated communities in Minnesota
Unincorporated communities in Scott County, Minnesota